Bad Tölz-Wolfratshausen (Bavarian: Bad Däiz-Woifradshausn) is a Landkreis (district) in Bavaria, Germany. It is bounded by (from the south and clockwise) Austria and the districts of Garmisch-Partenkirchen, Weilheim-Schongau, Starnberg, Munich and Miesbach.

History 

The district was established in 1972 by merging the former districts of Bad Tölz and Wolfratshausen. Bad Tölz-Wolfratshausen has two castles, Castle Hohenburg and Seeburg (Münsing).

Geography 

Bad Tölz-Wolfratshausen is one of the alpine districts on the German-Austrian borders. The valley of the Upper Isar River separates the Bavarian Alps from the Karwendel, a portion of the Alps mainly located in Austria. The highest peak of the district is the Schafreuter (2100 m).

The Isar River enters the district in the southwest and runs northwards passing the two main towns of the district, Bad Tölz and Wolfratshausen. In the high alpine south there are several mountain lakes: Walchensee (16 km2), Kochelsee (6 km2) and Sylvensteinsee (an artificial lake in the course of the Isar River). In the northwest the district borders on Lake Starnberg (Starnberger See).

Coat of arms 
The coat of arms displays:
 the heraldic lion of the medieval county of Wolfratshausen
 the blue and white checked pattern of Bavaria
 the staffs symbolising the famous Benediktbeuern Abbey

Towns and municipalities

Museums 

 Erinnerungsort Badehaus (Remebrance Place Badehaus)

References

External links 

Official website (German)